The Graf Zeppelin (Registration: D-LZ 130) was the last of the German rigid airships built by Zeppelin Luftschiffbau during the period between the World Wars, the second and final ship of the Hindenburg class, and the second zeppelin to carry the name "Graf Zeppelin" (after the LZ 127) and thus often referred to as Graf Zeppelin II.  Due to the United States refusal to export helium to Germany, the Graf Zeppelin II was filled with hydrogen and therefore never carried commercial passengers.  It made 30 flights over 11 months in 1938–39, many being propaganda publicity flights; but staff of the Reich Air Ministry were aboard to conduct radio surveillance and measurements. The airship, along with its LZ 127 namesake were both scrapped in April 1940, and their duralumin framework salvaged to build aircraft for the Luftwaffe.

Design and development

The Graf Zeppelin II was virtually identical to the Hindenburg, and was originally designed to use hydrogen as lifting gas. It was conceived to replace the aging LZ 127 Graf Zeppelin on flying the South American transatlantic route while the Hindenburg would continue flying the North American route. Following the Hindenburg disaster in May, 1937, Dr. Hugo Eckener vowed never again to use hydrogen in a passenger airship. This led to modifications such that the Graf Zeppelin II could be inflated with helium. The only source of helium in large enough quantities at that time was in the United States, so Eckener traveled to Washington, D.C. to lobby for helium for his airships. He visited President Roosevelt himself, who promised to supply helium, but only for peaceful purposes. After the annexation of Austria in March 1938, U.S. Secretary of the Interior Harold Ickes refused to supply helium, and the Graf Zeppelin II was ultimately filled with hydrogen.

Though the LZ 130 was nearly identical in design to the LZ 129 Hindenburg, there were a few minor improvements. The tail fins were 60 cm shorter and the number of intermediate ribs was reduced to save weight and reduce stress on the trailing edge of the fin. As the ship was designed for hydrogen, there would be additional "luxury cabins" with windows on the starboard side allowing for a total of 70 passengers (this was added to the Hindenburg over the winter of 1936–1937). The lower fin had an upward curve similar to the Hindenburgs final design (after the fin was damaged during a propaganda flight), giving more clearance with the ground.  To further reduce weight, the girder shape and riveting were changed slightly. The four engine car gondolas were initially designed and installed to have the same pusher configuration as the Hindenburg;  after the Hindenburg disaster, the engine pods were completely redesigned and reinstalled, using the same DB-602 diesel engines powering tractor propellers. These new pods were  slightly larger to accommodate the new exhaust water recovery system and were better insulated than those on the Hindenburg with engine noise noticeably reduced. In later flights, the airship used variable-pitch three-bladed propellers on both of its rear engines; trials were run on the forward port engine car as the ship neared completion, but only the aft-port engine car had a three-bladed propeller on its first flight. Unlike the wooden propellers of the Hindenburg, which had problems with moisture absorption causing imbalance, these three-bladed propellers were made of plastic wood and individual blades were assembled onto a main hub. The engines featured a new water recovery system which captured the exhaust of the engines, recovering water vapor present in the exhaust gases and condensing it for storage in tanks aboard the airship, to compensate for the fuel's weight lost during flight such that helium would not need to be valved.

The 16 gas cells were lightened and one was made of lightweight silk instead of cotton.  On the bow near the nose cone there were just two windows, as in the Hindenburgs original design (in the Hindenburg more windows were later fitted after its test flights). The German investigation on the Hindenburg disaster suggested the poor conductivity of the Hindenburgs outer skin played a role in the ignition of hydrogen. As a result, the cords connecting the panels were treated with graphite to increase the outer covering's electrical conductivity. Other redesigns included the gas vent hoods, gondola windows and the landing wheel design.

The passenger decks of the Graf Zeppelin II  were markedly different from those on the Hindenburg and had been completely redesigned to accommodate 40 passengers, compared to the Hindenburg's 72. Viewed externally, the promenade windows were half a longitudinal panel lower compared to the Hindenburg. The twenty cabins would be more spacious and had better lighting compared to those of the Hindenburg; thirteen of them had windows, and four of these were "luxury cabins" on the upper "B" deck. Instead of two passenger decks, the Graf Zeppelin II had one and a half, divided into four sections. The "A" deck consists of the dining room along the central rear section of the passenger quarters, slightly elevated from the "B" deck running along the upper promenade windows, which contained lounges, smoking room and the luxury cabins. Sixteen passenger cabins as well as the kitchen and passenger lavatories were located in Deck "C". Deck "D", on the rear side of the lower deck, contains the officer's mess, crew's mess and lavatories, as well as the electrical room.

Construction timeline23 June 1936 – The keel of the airship was laid and the main rings were fastened onto the roof of the hangar. Although the first few rings were assembled within the hangar, a separate ring assembly shed was completed soon after, and rings were constructed and transported from the shed to the hangar using tracks on the field.14 February 1937 – The nose cone was installed. In the same month, the fabric was also applied over the framework.6 May 1937 – The LZ 129 Hindenburg bursts into flames and crashes while landing at Lakehurst, New Jersey, killing 35 out of 97 people on board and one member of the ground crew. Although the LZ 130 was planned to be launched later in the year with a passenger flight route to Rio de Janeiro on 27 October, the disaster halted this plan and prompted several redesigns of the airship, such that its construction would be further delayed.November 1937 – Chief designer Ludwig Dürr proposes a redesign of the engine car gondolas to tractor configuration for better efficiency, as both sides of the gondola can act as radiators. Wind tunnel tests in October showed a significant decline in propeller performance of the original engine cars with the water recovery system taken into account.15 August 1938 – Inflation began on gas cells.20 August 1938 – Engines and electrical connections are tested.22 August 1938 – The radio communication system is tested.14 September 1938 – The ship was christened and flew the first time. Only Zeppelin Company officials and Hermann Göring were present; no other government representatives came to the christening to congratulate Eckener, and he made the speech himself.

Although a banner with the name Graf Zeppelin 2 (with Arabic numeral) was hung on the wall of the construction shed during the airship's assembly,  the LZ 130 itself never bore an additional numeral, since the original Graf Zeppelin (LZ 127) had been retired.

By the time the Graf Zeppelin II was completed, it was obvious that the ship would never serve its intended purpose as a passenger liner; the lack of a supply of inert helium was one cause. The Reich Air Ministry permitted the Graf Zeppelin to fly "for one year until 1 September 1939 without any transportation of passengers and outside of tropical areas". Dr. Ernst Breuning, who was responsible for radio development for the RLM, negotiated with the Zeppelin company to have the airship used as a laboratory for radio surveillance and measurements. As a result, the passenger accommodations were modified to contain radio and measuring instruments. Part of the cover was to have the airship make public appearances at air shows ("Flying Days") and deliver mail. In addition to Breuning's group of radio engineers (termed "Group R"), there were also a team of physicists from the Drahtlostelegraphische und Luftelektrische Versuchsstation Gräfelfing (DVG) led by Max Dieckmann, whose intention was to study electric discharge and its role in the Hindenburg disaster.

Operational history
In total, the Graf Zeppelin made thirty flights, covering 36,550 kilometers in a total air time of 409 hours:

Flights 1 to 71. 14 September 1938 – The maiden voyage took place immediately after the christening of the ship under the command of Eckener. The ship took off from Friedrichshafen at 7:50 AM with 74 people mainly Air Ministry, and Zeppelin Company officials on board. Also on board were the builders, technicians and RLM radio engineers posing in civilian clothing. The engines were only started after the airship reached a height of approximately 100 m. The Graf Zeppelin flew across Munich, Augsburg and Ulm, landing at the Löwenthal hangar at 1:30 PM, travelling a total of 925 kilometres. Eckener described the trip as "satisfying" and "successful."2. 17–18 September 1938 – The second trip was a 26-hour test trip under the command of Eckener and Captain Hans von Schiller with a total of 85 persons on board. It started at 8:08 AM on 17 September 1938. The morning was spent over the Bodensee with different measurements. At noon the ship flew north towards Stuttgart at 12:15 and Frankfurt am Main at 13:15, and then towards Eisenach and Eisleben. Towards evening Berlin was reached. After many circuits at low altitude the Graf started towards Hamburg. Over the outer-Elbe-estuary in the Wadden Sea further calibrations and tests were made. Afterwards it flew a direct course over Minden towards Frankfurt am Main and then towards Bodensee. There, the airship had to fly a large loop over Friedrichshafen, because the airfield lay in fog. At 10:17, LZ 130 landed after covering 2,388 km, and shortly before 11 o'clock was brought back into the Löwenthaler hangar.3. 22 September 1938 – The third trial flight; 8:13–19:30 1215-km loop over Munich and Vienna. Although it was officially a demonstration trial flight, the airship, escorted by four Messerschmitt Bf 109's disguised as civilian police planes, was flown over the Czech border for espionage purposes; some authors have deemed this to be unlikely, considering the speed difference between the two aircraft. This was the last time Eckener commanded an airship; he did not mention this flight in his memoirs.4. 25 September 1938 – Launch approx. 11:00 under Captain Hans von Schiller (duration approx. 7 h, 764 km, 40 crew members, 34 passengers and technicians). Tests at high altitude were made. Almost the whole trip took place at an altitude of about 2,000 m, without needing to valve much gas. Further atmospheric-electrical tests were made.5. 27 September 1938 – eleven hours of trip duration, on behalf of the Reich Air Ministry (RLM) under the command of Captain Albert Sammt. At the airport and airship-port Rhein-Main a radio beacon was set up. The idea was to attempt a Funkbeschickung (a calibration of the direction-finding equipment). Hazy air hindered the attempts despite good weather conditions. The calibration did not succeed perfectly these problems arose even at later attempts. There were also first successes with the Ballastwassergewinnungsanlage (a water recovery system to save ballast), such that no gas had to be valved except for about 600 cubic meters for weight off. Three and a half tonnes of ballast water could be saved and the engines ran quieter because of the sound-absorbing effect of the device.6 28 September 1938 – Further test flight on behalf of the RLM under Captain Sammt. Additionally, members of the DVG under the direction of Max Dieckmann were on board to investigate whether electrostatic charges caused the Hindenburg disaster. Therefore, it was especially flown during thunderstorms, as flights during normal weather conditions brought no useful results. The ship was flown into the stormfront slack (gas cells under-expanded), to prevent the over-pressure valves releasing hydrogen. The trip lasted nearly 26 hours; covering over 2,500 km. The ballast water recovery system fulfilled the engineers' expectations by producing about nine tons of water.7. 31 October 1938 – Launch at 14:17 under the command of Captain Sammt. This was the last inspection flight and also the transfer flight to Flug- und Luftschiffhafen Frankfurt am Main (the airship port at Frankfurt am Main). It landed after nearly 25 hours, covering over 2,100 km at 15:10 on November 1. The airship and the crew were welcomed by Gauleiter Sprenger at the new home port. After this trip LZ 130 on 14 November 1938 received the Luftschiff-Zulassungsschein (airship registration document). Thus it was certified for air traffic and registered in the German Luftfahrzeugrolle (aircraft register), with the restriction of no carriage of passengers.

Flight 8 – Sudetenlandfahrt8. “Sudetenlandfahrt” ("Sudetenland journey") also known as the Sudetendeutsche Freiheitsfahrt 1938, was made at the behest of the Reich Ministry for Public Enlightenment and Propaganda  (Reichsministerium für Volksaufklärung und Propaganda or Propagandaministerium). After the popular vote resulted in a large majority for Hitler and the National Socialist Party many propaganda channels were used including a Zeppelin flight over the befreiten Gebiete ("liberated regions"). On board were 62 crew members and 7 passengers, among them military officers. Taking off on 2 December 1938, LZ130 arrived over Reichenberg (present-day Liberec), capital of Sudetenland (a German-speaking area in Czechoslovakia), timed to match Hitler's visit. Small parachutes were thrown out with swastika flags and handbills carrying the text "Dein JA dem Führer!" ("Your YES for the leader"). LZ 130's loudspeakers played music and National Socialist propaganda for the forthcoming December 4 elections. Afterwards LZ 130 flew to the Reichenberg airfield and dropped 663 kg of postally cacheted souvenir mails. Worsening weather hindered further flight, and after some time it was decided to turn back. After the ship left the Sudetenland, it came into low cloud and snow showers. It started to ice up. Later, the propellers blew broken-off ice shards through the ship's outer envelope. However, the crew immediately repaired the damage. The Zeppelin landed without problem in gusty winds at 17:46 and was brought into the airship hangar.

Flights 9 to 23
Owing to poor weather conditions, the ship only made two flights during the spring of 1939.9. 13 January 1939 launched at 9:08, commanded by Captain Sammt, different tests were performed. Duration: 7 hours and 523 km10. 13 April 1939 Among other things, radio- and spy basket tests were performed. As the airship's framework caused spurious reflections of radio signals, a spy basket or "cloud car" was installed in the hull with radio equipment. This could be lowered on a steel cable below the cloud layer. Over Stettin, DVG engineer Seiler fell overboard when his parachute deployed when the release switch got caught. He received minor skull fracture and a broken collar bone when he struck the tail of the cloud car while falling. In a flight lasting approximately 30 hours it covered nearly .11. 15 June 1939 Duration: 28-hour flight for further measurements; 2,800 km. The ship flew over Cologne, Hamburg, Berlin, Leipzig and Bad Neustadt an der Saale before returning to Frankfurt at 6:18 pm on 16 June.12. and 13. Meiningenfahrt 2 July 1939 ; 18:40 landing at Meiningen airfield, flew back to Frankfurt am Main at 19:22.14. and 15. Leipzigfahrt (Leipzig trip) 9 July 1939; among other things landing in Leipzig-Mockau airfield with post office delivery16. Nordseefahrt (North Sea trip) 12 to 14 July 1939. Launch: 22:25; 45-hour trial spy mission over the North Sea. General Wolfgang Martini, head of the Luftwaffe signals organisation, wanted to find out whether Britain possessed a workable radar for detecting aircraft. His suspected that the 350-foot-high aerial masts of the then-secret Chain Home system were the basis of such a system. So he gained permission for the Graf Zeppelin to be converted to investigate this. New high-frequency receivers were installed, and an aerial array rigged underneath the gondola. With general Martini on board, the flight set course for RAF Bawdsey research station and then turned north and flew parallel to the British east coast. Nothing was detected by the Graf Zeppelin but the airship itself was detected by Chain Home. Over the Humber Estuary the airship transmitted a position report home stating it was off the coast of Yorkshire. This was a mistake as its actual position was over Hull. The airship then turned for home.17. and 18. Görlitzfahrt (Görlitz trip) launch: 16 July 1939 00:34 under captain Sammt. An intermediate stop was made in Görlitz, which the LZ 127 Graf Zeppelin previously visited on October 5, 1930.  After a quick mail drop and exchange of goods, the ship took off within two minutes after landing, as there was bad weather in the vicinity. Several personnel at the landing site, including Captain Heinrich Bauer, were unable to board the ship as previously planned.19. 20., and 21. Bielefeld-Münster-Fahrt (Bielefeld-Münster trip): 23 July 1939. The ship first flew over Nürburgring where the 1939 German Grand Prix was taking place. The ship remained for 5 laps and broadcast a radio commentary, before landing at the Flying Day events at Bielefield and Münster later that day.22. and 23.:To Kassel: 30 July 1939, commanded by Captain Anton Wittemann. This 7-hour flight covered 600 km, flying over the air show events at both Frankfurt (at the old Rebstock airport) and in Kassel where the ship made a short stop-over.

Flight 24 – Espionage24. The "espionage trip" of 2 to 4 August 1939, taking over 48 hours and covering , was the longest trip the LZ 130 made. The main goal was to secretly collect information on the British Chain Home radar system. To do this the airship flew northwards close to the British east coast to the Shetland Isles and back. As well as the 45 crew, 28 personnel engaged in the measurements were carried. Lifting off was around 20:53 on 2 August 1939, it overflew Hildesheim at 23:38, seen by very few people.

According to the memoirs of Albert Sammt, Mein Leben für den Zeppelin (translation: "My life for the zeppelin") in the chapter Mit LZ 130 Graf Zeppelin auf Funkhorch- und Funkortungsfahrt ("with the LZ 130 Graf Zeppelin on the radio-listening and radiolocation trip")  written by Breuning, a radio-measuring spy basket was used. Sammt flew the LZ 130 up Britain's east coast stopping the engines at Aberdeen  pretending they had engine failure in order to investigate strange antenna masts. They drifted freely westwards over land and according to Breuning, saw for the first time the new Supermarine Spitfires, which were then photographed as they circled the airship. This alleged encounter with Spitfires is not supported by contemporary news sources, which state that the LZ 130 was intercepted by two RAF planes dispatched from Dyce Airport, a Miles Magister carrying 612 Squadron Leader Finlay Crerar and Officer Robinson, and an Avro Anson.

The last sighting from the ground of the Graf Zeppelin was by the lighthouse keeper of Girdle Ness Lighthouse who was surprised to see the airship overhead at below 1,000 feet. Graf Zeppelin cruised on up to the Scapa Flow naval base, catching glimpses of British warships through the clouds. In the early evening the Graf Zeppelin turned back to Germany without having detected any Chain Home radar transmissions. After a Daily Telegraph report of the flight, a German communiqué was issued on 4 August stating: ‘The airship cannot leave Germany without special permission. There can be no question of an intention to fly over near British territory. There have, however, been severe storms during the last day or two and it is possible that the airship could have been blown off her course over the North Sea.’

On their return journey, as they neared Frankfurt on the evening of 4 August they were warned by radio that landing was not yet possible. At first they suspected an aeroplane had crashed at the site, but on overflying saw nothing amiss. They turned and flew towards the Rhön Mountains and on asking, were informed "landing before dusk not possible". They decided to return to Frankfurt and speak directly with the landing team (Landemannschaft) using their very high frequency transmitter, so that they would not be overheard by the French and so that they could speak in Swabian German to Beurle, the landing team leader.

According to Breuning's account, Beurle informed them they must not land yet because the British had lodged a diplomatic protest over their actions and a British delegation was at the airfield, with agreement of the German government, to inspect the ship. They were under suspicion. Beurle told them to wait while they thought of something. Shortly, the LZ 130 received instructions. They were to hide all the equipment on the ship and not to land at the usual well-lit landing point where a landing team was waiting, but to land at the other end where the "real" landing team was waiting. Once they had landed there, the technicians were to get off and they would be replaced by a unit of Sturmabteilung. The British delegation waiting at the usual landing place were told that, due to the weather, the airship had to land at another part of the airfield. By the time the British reached the airship, the spy crew was on a bus on their way to their hotel. Although they searched the ship, the British found nothing suspicious on the ship nor in the decoy SA-crew.  Breuning's account has been questioned; there is no official record of the British filing a diplomatic protest.

Breuning explained that the trip's results were negative, but not because the British radar was switched off, as Churchill wrote in his memoirs. The German General Wolfgang Martini, who was the Chief of Signal Affairs of the Luftwaffe, used a strong, impulsive, broadband radio transmission for determining the "radio-weather", the best wavelengths to use for radio. These impulses severely disturbed their highly sensitive receivers in the 10–12 metre waveband. Breuning wrote that he repeatedly requested Martini to stop transmitting during the spy trips, to no avail. This made it impossible for the LZ 130 to investigate the very wavebands the British were using. An alternative account was given after the war by General Martini who had issued the orders for the espionage trip; he told British radar pioneer Edward Fennessy that German naval radar experiments were based on much higher frequency wavebands than the British were using, and that the scientists on board concluded that the signals which they were receiving were not connected with detection equipment.

Flights 25 to 3025. and 26. Würzburgfahrt (Würzburg trip) 6 August 193927. and 28. Egerfahrt (Cheb trip) 13 August 193929 and 30.''' The last trip, the so-called Essen/Mülheim-Fahrt (Essen/Mülheim trip), took place on 20 August 1939. The departure and destination was Frankfurt am Main with an intermediate stop at Essen/Mülheim Airport, commanded by Albert Sammt. This trip (landing at 21:38) meant the end of large airship transport.

The end of the Zeppelins
A flight to Königsberg was planned for 26 August 1939, but it was cancelled as the airships were a potential hazard with the imminent war. On this day, the ship was taken out of its hangar, turned around and re-entered the hangar in a position convenient for dismantling. By 1 September, the LZ 130 was grounded with its gas cells deflated and electrical equipment removed. Until January 1940, efforts were made to preserve the airship in its current state so that it could be recommissioned after the war, but on 20 November 1939, a DZR Supervisory Board meeting decided that the two remaining zeppelins and their hangars would be demolished. Several attempts by the DZR to appeal this decision were unsuccessful.

On 29 February 1940, Hermann Göring issued the order to scrap both Graf Zeppelins and the unfinished framework of LZ 131, since the metal was needed for other aircraft. By 27 April, work crews had finished disassembling the airships and recycled all the materials. On 6 May, the enormous airship hangars in Frankfurt were levelled by explosives, three years to the day after the destruction of the Hindenburg.

Specifications (LZ129 Hindenburg class)Note: The LZ130 Graf Zeppelin II was similar in most respects

See also

Notes

References
Archbold, Rick. Hindenburg: An Illustrated History. Warner Books, 1994. 
Bauer, Manfred, and Duggan, John. LZ 130 Graf Zeppelin und das Ende der Verkehrsluftschiffahrt (English version: LZ 130 "Graf Zeppelin" and the End of Commercial Airship Travel, 1996). Zeppelin-Museum, Friedrichshafen 1998. .
Dick, Harold G., and Robinson, Douglas H. The Golden Age of the Great Passenger Airships: Graf Zeppelin and Hindenburg.'' Smithsonian Press, 1986. 
Sammt, Albert.  Mein Leben für den Zeppelin (in German).  Verlag Pestalozzi Kinderdorf Wahlwies, 1988, pp. 167–168. . (Extract covering LZ 130's spying trip from 2 to 4 August 1939.

External links

Technical drawing of the LZ 130
Zeppelin Study Group — Research group for airship memorabilia and Zeppelin mail
LZ130 under construction in 1937, with the original pusher engine car design
Graf Zeppelin – First Flight 14 September 1938 British Pathe newsreel of the maiden flight, Film ID: 981.27
Colour footage of the LZ 130 in 1938

Zeppelins
1930s German military reconnaissance aircraft